The 1995–96 Virginia Cavaliers men's basketball team represented the University of Virginia during the 1995–96 NCAA Division I men's basketball season. The team was led by sixth-year head coach Jeff Jones, and played their home games at University Hall in Charlottesville, Virginia as members of the Atlantic Coast Conference.

Last season
The Cavaliers had a record of 25–9.

Roster

Schedule 

|-
!colspan=9 style="background:#00214e; color:#f56d22;"| Regular season

|-
!colspan=9 style="background:#00214e; color:#f56d22;"| ACC Tournament

References

Virginia Cavaliers men's basketball seasons
Virginia
Virginia Cavaliers men's basketball
1996 in sports in Virginia